John Washington (c. 1631–1677) was an English-American politician and great-grandfather of George Washington.

John or Johnny Washington may also refer to:

Sports

American football
John Washington (American football) (born 1963), American football defensive tackle
John Washington or John Jefferson (born 1956), American football wide receiver
John David Washington (born 1984), American actor and former football player

Baseball
Johnny Washington (first baseman) (1916–1984), American baseball player
Johnny Washington (pitcher) (born 1930), American baseball player
Johnny Washington (baseball coach) (born 1984), American baseball coach

Other
John Washington (Royal Navy officer) (1800–1863), British admiral and hydrographer
John Augustine Washington (1736–1787), American politician and brother of George Washington
John David Washington (born 1984), American actor and former football player 
John M. Washington (died 1853), U.S. artillery officer and military governor of New Mexico
John M. Washington (slave) (1838–1918), American slave and memoirist
John P. Washington (1908–1943), Roman Catholic priest, chaplain and U.S. Army officer
John Thornton Augustine Washington (1783–1841), American politician and great-nephew of George Washington